Oval is an area in south London, in the London Borough of Lambeth. It is part of Kennington near The Oval cricket ground, situated 2.1 miles (3.38 km) to the south-east of Charing Cross. Oval straddles the border of south-west London and south-east London, and is where the postcode SE11 converges with the postcodes SW8 and SW9.

Oval is within the borough constituency of Vauxhall. The Member of Parliament for the area is Florence Eshalomi of the Labour Party.

History 

The land here was, from the seventeenth century, used for a market garden. The name "Oval" emerged from a street layout which was originated in 1790 but never completely built. The Montpelier Cricket Club leased ten acres of land from the Duchy of Cornwall in 1844, and Surrey County Cricket Club was formed soon thereafter at a meeting at the Horns Tavern (since demolished) on Kennington Park Road.

Demography 
Oval ward is in the Vauxhall parliamentary constituency and is one of four wards in the borough's north Lambeth division. It includes part of Kennington and some of the River Thames. In 2001, the National Census recorded a population of 11,983 for Oval.

Lambeth council elections 

 

At the Lambeth Council elections, 2010 residents of Oval ward elected two Labour Party Councillors and one Liberal Democrat Councillor.

In the 2014 and 2018 Lambeth Council elections residents returned four Labour councillors, Jack Hopkins, Claire Holland, Jane Edbrooke (2014) and Philip Normal (2018).

Transport 
The nearest tube stations are Oval, Kennington, Stockwell and Vauxhall station.

Nearest places

See also

References

External links
Lambeth Council profile for the ward
Lambeth Council map of the ward
Oval ward results on Lambeth website
Lib Dem Councillor's blog
Oval Labour blog
census information

Wards of the London Borough of Lambeth
Areas of London
Districts of the London Borough of Lambeth